Siniestro Total (meaning literally 'total write-off' as in the insurance term for a vehicle that is beyond repair following a motor accident) is a Galician punk rock group from Vigo, Spain. It was founded in 1981 during the cultural movement called Movida viguesa by Julián Hernández, Alberto Torrado and Miguel Costas. After many changes in personnel, current members are Julián Hernández, Javier Soto, Óscar G. Avendaño, Ángel González and Jorge Beltrán.

Style 

Their first album, ¿Cuándo se come aquí? (When do we eat?), features very short songs, with a marked punk style. In the second one, Siniestro Total II: El Regreso (Siniestro Total II: The Return), songs are essentially punk, but more instruments come to play. In the third one, Menos mal que nos queda Portugal (At least we still have Portugal), the punk evolves to a more classical rock, although lyrics are still punk. In the fourth one, Bailaré sobre tu tumba (I'll dance over your grave) the rock style continues. The fifth and sixth ones, De hoy no pasa (Today is the last time) and Me gusta cómo andas (I like the way you walk), the rock is still softer, becoming power-pop, whereas the lyrics continue being punk in essence.

The seventh, En beneficio de todos (For the general good), they get back to rock, and lyrics evolve and become more complex. The eighth and ninth ones, Made in Japan and Policlínico miserable (Miserable clinic), feature a harder rock (even heavy metal, and lyrics are darker and more critical. In their tenth album, Sesión vermú (Vermouth session), the rock is softer. They make an unexpected turn in their eleventh album, La historia del blues (The history of blues), and they play blues, with lyrics based in someone else's work (Jack Griffin). With the twelfth one, Popular, democrático y científico (Popular, democratic and scientific), they return to rock, with a style close to grunge.

Members 
Current members
Julián Hernández — guitar, vocals, drums, synthesisers (1981–present)
Javier Soto — guitar, backing vocals (1985–present)
Jorge Beltrán — saxophone, backing vocals (1996–present)
Óscar G. Avendaño — bass, backing vocals (2001–present)
Miguel Costas — guitar, vocals (1981-1994), (2022)
Andrés Cunha — drums (2018–present)

Former members
Alberto Torrado — guitar, bass, backing vocals (1981-1987)
Germán Coppini — vocals (1981-1983; died 2013)
Ángel González — drums (1988–2018)
Segundo Grandío — bass, backing vocals (1988-2001)

Discography

Studio albums 

 :es:¿Cuándo se come aquí? (1982)
 :es:Siniestro Total II: El Regreso (1983)
 Menos mal que nos queda Portugal (1984)
 Bailaré sobre tu tumba (1985)
 :es:De hoy no pasa (1987)
 Me gusta cómo andas (1988)
 En beneficio de todos (1990)
 es:Made in Japan (1993)
 :es:Policlínico miserable (1995)
 Sesión vermú (1997)
 La historia del blues (2000)
 Popular, democrático y científico (2005)
 :es:Country & Western (2010)
 El mundo da vueltas (2016)

Live albums 

 Ante todo mucha calma (1992)
 Cultura popular (1997)
 Así empiezan las peleas (1997)
 Que parezca un accidente (2008)
 La Noche de La Iguana (2014)

Compilation albums 

 Gran D Sexitos (1986)
 ¿Quiénes somos? ¿De dónde venimos? ¿A dónde vamos? (2002)

Collaborations 

 Héroes de los ochenta (1990)
 Trabajar para el enemigo (1992)
 Ojalá estuvieras aquí (1993)
 Gato por liebre (1997)
 L'asturianu muévese (1997)
 La edad de oro del pop español (2001)

References

External links 
Official site of Siniestro Total
Siniestro Total - Music Biography, Credits and Discography : AllMusic
Siniestro Total - lafonoteca.net

Spanish punk rock groups
Rock en Español music groups
Galician musical groups
1981 establishments in Galicia (Spain)
Musical groups established in 1981
People from Vigo